is a Japanese manga series written and illustrated by Yū Saitō. It was posted as a webcomic on Saitō's Twitter account from June 2018 to March 2021, and was later parallelly serialized in Shogakukan's Monthly Shōnen Sunday from January 2019 to March 2021, with its chapters collected into six tankōbon volumes.

Publication 
Giji Harem is written and illustrated by Yū Saitō. The series was first posted as a webcomic on Saitō's Twitter account from June 20, 2018 to March 5, 2021. The manga was subsequently and parallelly serialized in Shogakukan's Monthly Shōnen Sunday from January 12, 2019 to March 12, 2021. Shogakukan collected its chapters into six tankōbon volumes, released from March 12, 2019 to April 12, 2021.

Volume list

Reception 
In 2019, the series was nominated for the 5th Next Manga Awards in the print category and was ranked 7th out of 50 nominees.

References

External links 
 Giji Harem at Gekkan Sunday 
 Giji Harem at Shogakukan Comic 

2019 manga
Romantic comedy anime and manga
Shogakukan manga
Shōnen manga
Manga series